Doberman is a 2003 album by Tomoyasu Hotei.

Track listing

2003 albums
Tomoyasu Hotei albums